Gypsy Davy is a 2011 documentary film, directed by Rachel Leah Jones, and co-produced by Jones and Philippe Ballaiche.

Synopsis 
The film is narrated by the director, Rachel Leah Jones, as a letter to her father. Her father is "David Serva," who was born David Jones, in Berkeley, California. Described as a "white-boy with Alabama roots", he went on to become a well known flamenco guitarist- the first American to have a successful career in flamenco in Spain. Jones' mother, Judith Jones, was a "Brooklyn-born Jewish girl" who became a flamenco dancer. The two started a family in Berkeley, California, in the early 1970s.

Serva quickly abandoned his wife and baby daughter, and during his life and career, he amassed a total of five wives, and had children with each of them. Through her own memories and those of his other children and wives, in Gypsy Davy Jones creates a personal and political portrait of a man, and examines the legacy of an artist and his family.

Production 
Gypsy Davy was in the making for about a decade. Over this time, producer-director Rachel Leah Jones  filmed her father, who had left her in infancy. She also interviewed her own mother, and  her half-siblings and their mothers, combining these interviews with archival footage and her own narration.

The film was created with support of the Israeli New Fund for Cinema and Television.

Release 
The US premiere of the Gypsy Davy was at the 2012 Sundance Film Festival. The film had previously screened in Israel in 2011 at the Jerusalem Film Festival.

Select festival screenings 

 Jerusalem International Film Festival, Israel, 2011
 Sundance Film Festival, USA, 2012
 True/False Film Festival, USA, 2012
 Visions du Reel Documentary Film Festival, Switzerland, 2012
 San Francisco Jewish Film Festival, Israel, 2012
 DMZ Docs, South Korea, 2012
 Taiwan International Documentary Film Festival, 2012
 Seville European Film Festival, Spain, 2012
 International Women's Film Festival in Rehovot, Israel, 2012
 DocNYC, USA, 2012
 Olympia Film Festival, USA, 2012
 Buenos Aires International Festival of Independent Cinema (BAFICI), Argentina, 2013
 Portland Jewish Film Festival, USA, 2013

Reception 
In his mostly-positive review, Screen Daily reviewer Tim Grierson writes that in spite of the main premise of a famous musician's infidelity being unsurprising, "director Rachel Leah Jones’s Gypsy Davy takes that truism and wrings something thought-provoking and melancholy from it." Though Grierson dislikes the narration, he praises the film's music and finds the family-member interviews to be the strongest point of the film. In his Variety review, Dennis Harvey calls the film "as engrossing as a flavorsome, twisty literary novel", lauding both the "colorful characters" and the music. Calling Gypsy Davy "an interesting story and great personal work", Jonas Weir, in Vox Magazine, sums the work up as "a portrait of a man who led an irresponsible life that hurt a lot of people and his daughter’s coming to terms with who he is. David Jones doesn’t seem like a completely rotten man, just a man who has done some completely rotten things."

John DeFore, on the other hand, in the Hollywood Reporter, calls the film a "self-obsessed personal voyage" that is uninteresting to anyone not involved in the story.

Awards

See also 

 Advocate
 Ashkenaz
 500 Dunam on the Moon

References

External links 

 
 "Meet the 2012 Sundance Filmmakers #18: Rachel Leah Jones", IndiWire, Jan 8, 2012
 "Documentary filmmaker Rachel Leah Jones on her film festival entry, ‘Gypsy Davy’", Sue McAllister, Mercury News, July 12, 2012

2011 films
Israeli documentary films
Documentary films about music and musicians